The Church of Scotland Act 1921 is an Act of the British Parliament. The purpose of the Act was to settle centuries of dispute between the British Parliament and the Church of Scotland over the Church's independence in spiritual matters. The passing of the Act saw the British Parliament recognise the Church's independence in spiritual matters, by giving legal recognition to the Articles Declaratory.

Background
The Church of Scotland was founded as a Presbyterian church in 1560 during the Scottish Reformation since when it has held that the civil power had no authority over it, in spiritual matters. The question of church establishment and in what sense the Church of Scotland was an  Established church led to conflicts with successive rulers from the Stuart monarchs onward. Monarchs tended to prefer the model of the Church of England, where the Crown had the power to appoint bishops, and various other forms of power over the Church (although it was not reduced to the complete state control found in Scandinavia).

The particular crisis came over the question of "lay patrons", who had the right to "present"
(appoint) a minister. This was abolished in 1690 at the time of the Glorious Revolution
but restored in 1712. In theory the congregation could accept or reject a candidate, but in
practice this often meant little. By the late 18th century the Church was divided into the Moderate
and Evangelical parties. These differed especially on the question of lay patronage,
which the Evangelicals rejected. Underlying this was the split between the Calvinism of the
Evangelicals and the more Enlightenment tone of the Moderates.

In 1833 the General Assembly of the Church of Scotland passed a Veto Act giving congregations
the clear power of veto. However the courts generally upheld the rights of lay patrons, and
thus the issue became one of Church and State. In 1843 a large part of the Church seceded as
the Free Church of Scotland — not rejecting Establishment in principle, but only its
present form.  This secession was known as the Disruption.

In the early 20th century a reunion between the Church of Scotland and the United Free
Church seemed possible. To overcome problems (including legal problems which had followed
the earlier merger of the Free Church and the United Presbyterian Church) the Church
of Scotland Act 1921 (11 & 12 Geo. 5 c. 29) was passed. This noted that the General
Assembly had passed Declaratory Articles. These were declared to be lawful. (Thus,
they were not created by parliament.) It was declared that "no limitation of the
liberty, rights, and powers in matters spiritual therein set forth shall be derived from
any statute or law affecting the Church of Scotland in matters spiritual at present
in force; it being hereby declared that in all questions of construction the Declaratory Articles shall prevail..." (s. 1).

Current position
This has created a new and revised relationship between the Church and the State.
The Church of Scotland remains the National Church, but it has complete independence in spiritual questions and appointments.  After the passing of the act, a church historian proclaimed: "No Church in Christendom can so fully claim to be at once national and free as the Church of Scotland today."

When legislating for Scotland since the passing of the Act, the British Parliament has to consider whether the Church of Scotland is to be excluded from the provisions. Examples included the passing of the Scotland Act 1998, which had to be worded not to infringe on the independence of the Church, and prevent the Scottish Parliament repealing the Church of Scotland Act. Also during the passing of the Human Rights Act 1998, an amendment was proposed when the bill was passing through the House of Lords to exclude the Church of Scotland from some of the provisions. In the end, this was not deemed necessary.

In 2005, the House of Lords finally decided the case Percy (AP) v Church of Scotland Board of National Mission [2005] UKHL 73 , ruling that, despite the 1921 Act, a ministerial appointment created a contract subject to the jurisdiction of the civil courts and employment tribunals.

See also

Religion in the United Kingdom
Articles Declaratory

References 

History of the Church of Scotland
Acts of the Parliament of the United Kingdom concerning Scotland
1921 in law
United Kingdom Acts of Parliament 1921
1921 in Scotland
Christianity and law in the 20th century
Law about religion in the United Kingdom
1921 in Christianity
Church of Scotland